Fraternity were an Australian rock band which formed in Sydney in 1970 and relocated to Adelaide in 1971. Former members include successive lead vocalists Bon Scott (who later joined AC/DC), John Swan (who also played drums and later had a solo career), and his brother Jimmy Barnes (Cold Chisel). Their biggest local hit was a cover version of "Seasons of Change" which peaked at No. 1 in Adelaide, but nationally it was overrun by the original Blackfeather version. The group won the 1971 Hoadley's Battle of the Sounds with the prize being a free trip to London. Fraternity went through various line-ups and was renamed as Fang (on British tour), Fraternity (again). In the late 70s some Fraternity former members created the bands Some Dream and Mickey Finn. Mickey Finn disbanded in 1992.

History
Fraternity were formed in Sydney, New South Wales, Australia in early 1970 by four ex-members of the recently split Levi Smith's Clefs, John Bisset on keyboards and vocals, Tony Buettel on drums, Bruce Howe on bass guitar and vocals, and Mick Jurd on lead guitar. The band recorded their debut single, "Why Did It Have to Be Me" which was issued on the Sweet Peach label in October. Howe was looking for a lead vocalist and called on Bon Scott, whose group The Valentines had just disbanded. They signed with Nova Agencies who also managed Sydney rockers, Blackfeather and their guitarist John Robinson would often jam with Fraternity. Early gigs were at Jonathon's Disco on Broadway in Sydney.

Scott was invited to play recorder on the Blackfeather track "Seasons of Change" for that band's debut album, At the Mountains of Madness. John Freeman (Levi Smith's Clefs) replaced Buettel on drums and Fraternity recorded their debut album, Livestock, which was produced by Doug Ashdown and Jimmy Stewart. In October 1970, Fraternity toured with Jerry Lee Lewis. Whilst in Adelaide they signed with a new manager, Hamish Henry of The Grape Organisation. The band relocated to Adelaide by January 1971 and performed at the Myponga Music Festival which was also financed and staged by Hamish Henry. Fraternity also issued a new single, "Livestock" in January. They followed with their arrangement of "Seasons of Change" in March. The song sold well and became a No. 1 hit in Adelaide – it reached No. 51 on the Go-Set National Top 60. Upon learning of Fraternity's success in Adelaide, Blackfeather quickly released their version, which overran Fraternity's and reached No. 15.

John Eyers (ex-No Sweat) joined on harmonica, recorder and vocals in May. Fraternity won the Hoadley's Battle of the Sounds – a national performance competition between the best bands representing each state – with the prize being a free trip to London. Scott's previous band, The Valentines, had been a finalist two years earlier. By September, Fraternity were touted as "The Next Big Band" by teen magazine, Go-Set. In 1971,  Fraternity performed live versions of "Seasons of Change", "Summerville" and "Raglan's Folly" on  GTK (TV series). Sam See (Sherbet, The Flying Circus) joined on piano and slide guitar. They recorded their second album, Flaming Galah, produced by Grape Productions, which appeared in April 1972. The same year, Fraternity performed live "Love 200", a Peter Sculthorpe composition, featuring Jeannie Lewis and Melbourne Symphony Orchestra. By that time, the band had taken their trip to London and attempted to crack the United Kingdom market. Bisset left to return to Australia and was followed out of the band by See who rejoined The Flying Circus (now based in Canada).

Fraternity were renamed as Fang in early 1973, but the band had stalled and was gradually disintegrating, with the remaining members returning to Australia by the year's end. Some members joined the loosely knit Mount Lofty Rangers project with fellow Adelaide-based Headband members. Scott recorded a couple of songs with Mount Lofty Rangers after being seriously injured in a motorcycle accident in early 1974. When Scott had recovered, he joined heavy rockers AC/DC in Sydney.

Late in 1974, Fraternity reformed with Eyers, Freeman, and Howe joined by Mauri Berg (Headband) on guitar, Peter Bersee on violin and John Swan (Hard Time Killing Floor) on lead vocals. In mid-1975, Freeman left and Swan switched to drums with his younger brother, Jimmy Barnes (Cold Chisel) joining on lead vocals.  Late in 1975   Barnes returned to Cold Chisel and Fraternity disbanded. John Swan, under the name Swanee, had a solo career.  Some Fraternity former members created the bands Some Dream and Mickey Finn. Mickey Finn comprised Eyers, Berg, Howe and Freeman. By 1980, a second guitarist, Stan Koritni, was added. They cut a self-titled album in 1980 for the Eureka label.

In 2021, newly unheard material uncovered by music historian Victor Marshall through his work with Fraternity and their manager Hamish Henry was released.

On 18th March 2021, The Grape Organisation held a Fraternity 50th Anniversary concert held at Adelaide's historic Thebarton Theatre.

Today, Fraternity continue to be managed by Hamish Henry & The Grape Organisation Pty Ltd, alongside co-director Victor Marshall.

Members
Bruce Howe – bass guitar, lead vocals, backing vocals (1970–1973, 1974–1975)
Mick Jurd – guitar (1970–1973) (deceased)
John Bisset – keyboards, lead vocals, backing vocals (1970–1973)
Tony Buettel – drums (1970-1971)
Bon Scott – lead vocals, recorder, backing vocals,   percussion (1971–1973) (deceased)
John Freeman – drums (1971–1973, 1974)
"Uncle" John Eyers – harmonica, recorder, backing vocals (1971–1973, 1974–1975)
Sam See – slide guitar, piano (1971–1973)
Mauri Berg – guitar (1974–1975)
John Swan – drums, vocals (1974–1975)
Peter Bersee – violin (1974–1975) (deceased)
Jimmy Barnes – vocals (1975)

Discography

Studio albums

Compilation albums

Singles

Other songs
 Raglan's Folly (Scott, Jurd) (live at GTK (TV series), 1971)
 Seasons of Change (Robinson, Johns) (live at GTK, 1971)  
 Somerville (Howe, See) (live at GTK, 1971)
 Love 200 (Sculthorpe) (live feat. Jeannie Lewis and Melbourne Symphony Orchestra, 1972)
 Second Chance (Berg, Howe, Freeman, Eyers) (Bruce Howe on vocals, 1974)
 One Night Stand (Berg, Howe, Eyers, Barnes, Swan, Bersee) (Jimmy Barnes on vocals, 1975)
 Floyd's Hotel (J. Geils Band) (Jimmy Barnes on vocals, 1975)

References

General

Specific

External links
 Fraternity's Official Website
 Fraternity's Facebook Page
 Exclusive interview with John Bisset
 Seasons of change video

Musical groups disestablished in 1981
Musical groups established in 1970
Musical groups disestablished in 1973
Musical groups reestablished in 1973
Musical groups disestablished in 1974
Musical groups reestablished in 1974
Australian progressive rock groups
Musical groups from Adelaide